Garib may refer to:

 Garib (film), a 1942 Indian film
 Garib Dassi, a community in Punjab
 Garib Rath Express, an express train on Indian Railways 
 Adriano Garib (born 1965), Brazilian actor
 Amir Garib, a 1974 Hindi movie
 Ptolemy-el-Garib, the Arabic name for a philosopher in the Peripatetic school
 a unit of currency in the game Glover